Nick Roth (born 27 April 1982) is an Irish / British saxophonist, composer, producer and educator.

Work
Roth's work explores the liberation of improvisation from composition, the poetic syntax of philosophical enquiry, and the function of music as translative epistemology (MaTE).

He has developed projects in collaboration with scientists Thomas E. Lovejoy, Margaret D. Lowman, Iain Couzin and Henry S. Horn and his work has been commissioned and performed by the European Saxophone Ensemble, T. S. Eliot Foundation, RTÉ ConTempo Quartet, Happy Days International Beckett Festival, Trio InVento, The Ark Cultural Centre for Children, Dublin Dance Festival, Hong Kong New Music Ensemble, Yurodny Ensemble, Emma Martin Dance, National Concert Hall Dublin, Temenos and Rough Magic Theatre Company, with performances at international festivals including the Irish representation at the ISCM World Music Days 2016 in Tongyeong, South Korea.

As a performer, his collaborations include work with Jennifer Walshe, Savina Yannatou, John Taylor, Iarla Ó Lionáird, M.C. Schmidt, Gavin Bryars, Bobby McFerrin, Tom Arthurs, Lucas Niggli, Kate Ellis, Mihály Borbély, Matthew Jacobson, Miklós Lukács, Francesco Turrisi, Cora Venus Lunny, Crash Ensemble, Alex Bonney, Petar Ralchev, Zohar Fresco, Alkinoos Ioannidis, Theodosii Spassov, and world premières of new works by composers Mamoru Fujieda, Alla Zagaykevych, Dan Trueman, Ian Wilson, Benjamin Dwyer, Panos Ghikas, Kamran Ince, Roger Doyle, Dan Trueman, Judith Ring, Mel Mercier, Linda Buckley, Ed Bennett, Onur Türkmen, Christian Mason, Francis Heery, Piaras Hoban and Elaine Agnew.

As an educator, he has lectured and given workshops at the California Academy of Sciences, Trinity College Dublin (TCD), European Space Research and Technology Centre (ESTEC), University College Cork (UCC), Sonic Arts Research Centre (SARC), University College Dublin (UCD), Institute for Biodiversity, Science and Sustainability, San Francisco (IBSS), Cork School of Music (CSM), University of Limerick (UL), University of Aalborg, Copenhagen, National University of Ireland (NUI), Royal Irish Academy of Music (RIAM) and the Norwegian Center for Technology in Music and the Arts (NOTAM).

He is the artistic director of the Yurodny Ensemble, a founding member of The Water Project, and a partner at Diatribe Records.

In 2015 he was composer-in-residence at the California Academy of Sciences and the Irish Museum of Modern Art (IMMA) and in 2017 was artist-in-residence at the European Space Agency (ESTEC).

Biography
Roth was born into a musical family in London; brothers Alex Roth and Simon Roth are also musicians, and mother Joy Mendelsohn is a music teacher (whose past students included Alastair King, George Michael and Andrew Ridgeley). He is married to Ukrainian vocalist Olesya Zdorovetska and since 2001 has been based in Dublin, Ireland.

He studied saxophone in London with Gilad Atzmon and composition in Dublin under Ronan Guilfoyle and Elaine Agnew, undertaking further studies of improvisation in New York City under Steve Coleman, Ravi Coltrane, and Vijay Iyer, of pedagogy in Kecskemét at the Zoltán Kodály Institute under Katalin Kiss, and of Makam theory and composition in Crete under Sokratis Sinopoulos and Ross Daly.

Selected works

Orchestra
Woodland Heights (2014) for string orchestra 
Flocking III (2013) for saxophone orchestra
Stille Nacht (2012) for jazz orchestra
Flocking I–II (2012) for string orchestra

Solo / Ensemble
Seed I–II (2016) for percussion and tape
Peregrinus (2016) for cathedral bells and electronics
Little Woodland Heights (2015) for children's ensemble 
A Way A Lone A Last (2015) for recorder trio
Temenos (2015) for bass clarinet and tenor recorder
LakeCycle (2013) for piano and percussion
StopStart (2012) for variable ensemble
Water Project I–II (2011) for open ensemble and water
Quintet (2010) for bass clarinet and string quartet 
Maoz Tsur (2010) for choir SSAA
Jamilia (2009) for piano
Griffmadár (2009) for large ensemble
I am the Sea (2009) for voice and piano
pliARS (2009) for large ensemble
Evenset (2008) for large ensemble
Parah (2008) for clarinet quartet
Innehølder (2006) for large ensemble

Theatre
The Waste Land (2015) for four voices, jazz quintet and film 
CAOS (2015) for dancer and improvising ensemble
Tundra (2014) for ensemble and tape 
Vartn af Godot (2014) for ensemble
Peer Gynt (2013) for ensemble
Don Giovanni (2011) for voices, ensemble and electronics

Discography

References

External links
 
 Contemporary Music Centre Portal
 
 

1982 births
21st-century classical composers
British classical composers
Irish classical composers
Living people
British male saxophonists
21st-century saxophonists
21st-century British male musicians